Soňa Gaborčáková (born 22 August 1977 in Stará Ľubovňa) is a Slovak social worker and politician. Between 2016 and 2020 she served as an MP of the National Council elected on the Ordinary People and Independent Personalities list. Since 2020 she has served as a State Secretary at the Ministry of Labor, Social Affairs and Family under minister Milan Krajniak. Since 2014 she has also served as a municipal assembly member in Stará Ľubovňa.

Gaborčáková graduated in 1999 in social work from the Matej Bel University and from Catholic University in Ružomberok in 2015. Between 1999 and her entry to politics in 2016, she worked as the Director of the Saint Anna House in Stará Ľubovňa, an institution founded by Gaborčáková under the patronage of the Greek Catholic Church serving young people with disability.

In 2016, she successfully ran in the 2016 Slovak parliamentary election on the Ordinary People and Independent Personalities list. In 2019 she left the party, together with her fellow Ordinary People and Independent Personalities MP Elena Červeňáková and joined Christian Democratic Movement.

Gaborčáková lost her parliamentary mandate in 2020, when the Christian Democratic Movement narrowly failed to pass the representation threshold in the 2020 Slovak parliamentary election. Nonetheless, in spite of the election defeat she remained active in politics, serving as a State Secretary at the Ministry of Labour, Family and Social Affairs under the Minister Milan Krajniak.

References 

Living people
1977 births
Matej Bel University alumni
Christian Democratic Movement politicians
OĽaNO politicians
People from Stará Ľubovňa
Members of the National Council (Slovakia) 2016-2020
Female members of the National Council (Slovakia)